Mark Blaug FBA (3 April 1927 – 18 November 2011) was a Dutch-born British economist (naturalised in 1982), who covered a broad range of topics during his long career.

He was married to Ruth Towse.

Life and work 
Blaug was born on 3 April 1927 in The Hague as Norbert Blauaug. In 1955 Blaug received his PhD from Columbia University in New York under the supervision of George Stigler. Besides shorter periods in public service and in international organisations he has held academic appointments in – among others – Yale University, the University of London, the London School of Economics, the University of Exeter and the University of Buckingham. He was visiting Professor in the Netherlands, University of Amsterdam and Erasmus University in Rotterdam, where he was also co-director of CHIMES (Center for History in Management and Economics).

Mark Blaug made far reaching contributions to a range of topics in economic thought throughout his career. Apart from valuable contributions to the economics of art and the economics of education, he is best known for his work in history of economic thought and the methodology of economics. Concerning methodological issues and the application of economic theory to a wide range of subjects from education to human capital, the "philosophy of science and the sweep of intellectual progress are fitting subjects to accommodate the breadth of Mark Blaug's interest."

He died on 18 November 2011 in Peter Tavy, Devon.

Selected quotations 

‘Cambridge theories of value and distribution themselves suffer from the very malady which they hope to cure: rhetoric apart, they are deeply infected by static, equilibrium analysis of maximizing economic agents, acting with full information in a world of perfect certainty, as in the orthodoxy they deplore. … If there is something wrong with neo-classical economics – as there may well be – the Cambridge theories share all of its weaknesses and practically none of its strengths.’ (Blaug, 1974, pp. 3, 69)

‘Joan Robinson’s much-awaited textbook in “modern economics” perfectly exemplifies the typical attitude of Cambridge economists to micro-economics. The whole of traditional price theory is covered in one chapter … [some] prices are formed by conventional mark-ups on prime costs, the level of the mark-up itself being left unexplained. Apart from this chapter, the book is doggedly macro-economic in treatment … A striking omission from the book is any mention of the closely related concepts of externalities and public goods, which most economists would nowadays regard as the basic ingredients of “market failure” that has come to be fruitfully applied … to problems of pollution and congestion.’ (Blaug, 1974, pp. 71-2)

‘Nothing is more difficult than to turn and entire discipline around, asking itself to jettison its own history over the last 200 years.’ Blaug (1990, p. 205).

‘Despite entries on socialism, socialist economics and market socialism, and biographical entries on Oskar Lange and Ludwig von Mises, the Socialist Calculation Debate, so crucial in the revival of general equilibrium theory and the rise of modern welfare economics in the 1930s, is nowhere discussed at length in The New Palgrave.’ Blaug (1990, p. 236). 

‘The history of economic thought is irrepressible. It would survive even if it were banned … it would be carried on in secret in underground organizations. Many economists denigrate the history of economics as mere antiquarianism but, in fact, they have deluded ideas about the history of their own subject. After all, whenever anyone has a new idea in economics, whenever anyone hankers to start a new movement or school of thought, what is the first thing he or she does? Why, it is to rummage the attic of past ideas to establish an appropriate pedigree for the new departure. … Smith, Ricardo, Marx, Marshall and Keynes all drew on the history of economics to show that they had predecessors and forerunners; even Milton Friedman, when he launched the monetarist counterrevolution against Keynes, could not resist the temptation to quote David Hume over and again. The history of economic thought cannot be abolished and, were its study declared illegal, it would be studied in basements behind locked doors.’ (‘Introduction’, to Blaug, M. (ed.) (1991) The Historiography of Economics (Aldershot: Edward Elgar), p. x.)

‘The Lange idea of managers following marginal cost-pricing rules because they are instructed to do so, while the central planning board continually alters the prices of both producer and consumer goods so as to reduce their excess demands to zero, is so administratively naive as to be positively laughable. Only those drunk on perfectly competitive, static equilibrium theory could have swallowed such nonsense. ... in all the recent calls for reform of Soviet bloc economies, no one has ever suggested that Lange was of any relevance whatsoever. And still more ironically, Lange’s “market socialism” is, on its own grounds, socialism without anything that can be called market transactions.’ Mark Blaug (1993) Review of David R. Steele From Marx to Mises, in Economic Journal, 103(6), November, p. 1571. 

‘Modern economics is “sick”. Economics has increasingly become an intellectual game played for its own sake and not for its practical consequences. Economists have gradually converted the subject into a sort of social mathematics in which analytical rigor as understood in math departments is everything and empirical relevance (as understood in physics departments) is nothing. If a topic cannot be tackled by formal modelling, it is simply consigned to the intellectual underworld. To pick up a copy of American Economic Review or Economic Journal, not to mention Econometrica or Review of Economic Studies these days is to wonder whether one has landed on a strange planet in which tedium is the deliberate objective of professional publication. Economics was condemned a century ago as “the dismal science”, but the dismal science of yesterday was a lot less dismal than the soporific scholasticism of today.’ Blaug (1998, p. 12)

Honours 
 In 1984 he was made a Foreign Member of the Royal Netherlands Academy of Arts and Sciences (KNAW).
 In 1988 he was made a Distinguished Fellow of the History of Economics Society.
 In 1989 he became an Elected Fellow of the British Academy.

Selected publications

Books 
 
Reprinted as: 
 Review: 
 
Revised as: 
Preview.
 
 
Revised as:  
Preview.

Chapters in books

Journal articles 
 
 
 Also available at JSTOR: link.

Anthologies 
 'Pioneers in Economics'. In 1991 and 1992 Blaug edited a series of fifty volumes, with reprints of journal articles on the history of economic thought, under the series title 'Pioneers in Economics'. The series was published by Edward Elgar Publishing.

References

Further reading 
 
 
 Erasmus Journal for Philosophy and Economics 6, 3, Winter 2013: Special Issue in Honor of Mark Blaug (complete PDF).

External links 

 

1927 births
2011 deaths
British economists
Dutch economists
Cultural economists
Historians of economic thought
Writers from The Hague
Columbia University alumni
Academics of the London School of Economics
Academics of the University of London
Academics of the University of Buckingham
Academic staff of Erasmus University Rotterdam
Fellows of the British Academy
Members of the Royal Netherlands Academy of Arts and Sciences
Dutch emigrants to the United Kingdom